Partyzanskaya (lit.: "Partisans' station") is a Minsk Metro station, which opened on 7 November 1997.

Gallery 

Minsk Metro stations
Railway stations opened in 1997